Ecce Homo is an unfinished oil-on-canvas painting by the French painter and caricaturist Honoré Daumier, created in 1850. It is in the collection of the Museum Folkwang in Essen, Germany.

The painting, executed in undertones of various shades of brown, depicts a scene in the Good Friday trial of Jesus when Christ is presented to the mob as a figure of ridicule by Pontius Pilate with the words "Ecce Homo", translated in the Bible as "Behold the Man", but more appropriately as an accusatory "Look at this man". The viewer is situated in the crowd in a position where he can observe Christ standing still and resolute, silhouetted against a sacred light, and asked to decide whether to sympathise with Him or with his tormentors.

The work is one of only a few that Daumier undertook on religious subjects, as distinct from his several depictions of contemporary French social inequalities.

The painting was included by French writer Michel Butor on his book selecting 105 decisive works of western painting.

See also
 100 Great Paintings
 Ecce homo

References

Paintings by Honoré Daumier
1850 paintings
Daumier
Cultural depictions of Pontius Pilate
Collection of the Museum Folkwang